Michael Lee Firkins is the self-titled first studio album by guitarist Michael Lee Firkins, released in 1990 through Shrapnel Records.

In a 2009 article by Guitar World magazine, the album was ranked eighth on the all-time top ten list of shred albums.

Critical reception

Vincent Jeffries at AllMusic reviewed very positively Michael Lee Firkins, praising Firkins' unique playing and guitar tone and suggesting that he was "one of the best artists (if not the best)" from Shrapnel's 1980s–early 90s shred line-up. He also highlighted "Déjà Blues", "Space Crickets" and "Laughing Stacks" as "instrumental classics".

Track listing

Personnel
Musicians
Michael Lee Firkins – guitar
Jeff Pilson – bass (except track 9)
Mark "Mooka" Rennick – bass (track 9), mixing assistance
James Kottak – drums

Production
Mike Varney – producer
Steve Fontano – producer, engineer, mixing 
Joe Marquez, Marc Reyburn, Shawn Micheal Morris – assistant engineers
Stuart Hirotsu – mixing assistance
George Horn – mastering at Fantasy Studios, Berkeley, California

References

External links
In Review: Michael Lee Firkins "Michael Lee Firkins" at Guitar Nine Records

1990 debut albums
Shrapnel Records albums
Albums produced by Mike Varney